First Baptist Church  is a Baptist  church in Charleston, South Carolina. It is affiliated with the Southern Baptist Convention. The congregation was founded in 1682 under the leadership of William Screven. It is one of the oldest Baptist congregations in the American South. The church congregation was originally organized in Kittery, Maine (then part of Massachusetts) under the guidance of the First Baptist Church of Boston. In 1696 twenty-six congregants followed Pastor Screven and moved to Charleston after being pressured by the New England Congregationalist authorities. The relocated congregation became the First Baptist Church of Charleston. Pastor Screven recommended that any future pastor be "orthodox in faith, and of blameless life, and does own the confession of faith put forth by our brethren in London in 1689" declaring the church to be firmly Calvinist (Reformed Baptist). First Baptist Church is currently affiliated with the Southern Baptist denomination.  The current Greek Revival sanctuary was designed by Robert Mills and built in 1820.

On June 26, 2019, the church announced the building will be closed after the July 7, 2019 services as a result of area reconstruction;  the education building demolition began in June 2019, and after full demolition begins in July 2019, it was deemed unsafe to be around the church.  The church will move to nearby James Island in their school auditorium until further notice, likely when officials assure the building will be safe to occupy.  The church has since been used for limited use by other churches and for their Christmas services, but the church continues to meet on James Island.

Sources

References

External links
Official Church Website
First Baptist Church - Charleston, South Carolina, includes photos and history

1682 establishments in South Carolina
Churches in Charleston, South Carolina
Baptist churches in South Carolina
Southern Baptist Convention churches